Tetra (stylised as Tetr4) is the first album from the French electronic music group C2C. It was released on September 3, 2012 off the On And On label. The album reached the top of the French chart from September 3, 2012 to September 9, 2012 and "Down the Road" peaked at 27 on Hot Modern Rock Tracks.

Track listing
 "The Cell" - 4:59
 "Down the Road" - 3:27
 "Kings Season (feat. Rita J. & Moongaï)" - 3:51
 "Because of You (feat. Pigeon John)" - 3:42
 "Delta" - 3:44
 "Who Are You (feat. Olivier Daysoul)" - 4:51
 "Happy (feat. Derek Martin)" - 3:55
 "Give Up the Ghost (feat. Jay-Jay Johanson)" - 5:24
 "The Beat" - 3:32
 "Genius (feat. Gush)" - 4:10
 "Together (feat. Ledeunff and Blitz the Ambassador)" - 4:51
 "Arcades" - 4:24
 "Le Banquet (feat. Tigerstyle, Netik, Rafik, Vajra & KENTARO)" - 4:56
 "F-U-Y-A" - 5:05

Deluxe Edition bonus tracks
The deluxe edition includes four remix tracks.
 "Together" (Neck Breakin' Edit) - 4:31
 "Down the Road" (Acoustic Cover) (featuring Bernhoft) - 4:50
 "Shout" (C2C Remix) (featuring Bernhoft) - 4:33
 "Give Up the Ghost" (Vintage Edit) (featuring Jay-Jay Johanson) - 4:01

Charts

Weekly charts

Year-end charts

References

2012 albums
C2C (group) albums
European Border Breakers Award-winning albums